Kamini Gadhok   (b. 1961) is a speech and language therapist, specialising in bilingualism and, since 2000, has served as the Chief Executive of the Royal College of Speech and Language Therapists.

Career
Gadhok graduated from the University of Manchester in 1983. She worked as a speech and language therapist in Nottingham Community Health NHS Trust as a locality manager and coordinator for the speech and language therapy services. She specialised in bilingualism and led the development of services for people for whom English was an additional language. She established the Asian bilingual co-worker service, the first of its kind in the country. In 1997, Kamini became ethnic health projects coordinator for the NHS and was seconded to the Department of Health to set up the Race Equality Unit, where she was section head until 2000. From 2007 to 2012 she was director of the National Literacy Trust. 

In her role as the Chief Executive of the Royal College of Speech and Language Therapists, Gadhok had advocated the prioritisation of children's language services by the UK government as a result of the findings of a 10-year impact assessment of the Bercow Report. In April 2022 Gadhok announced that she will be retiring from her role as CEO of the RCSLT in March 2023. In October 2022, the RCSLT announced the appointment of Steve Jamieson as Gadhok's successor, taking up the post in March 2023.

Gadhok was awarded an Member of the Order of the British Empire in the 2009 Birthday Honours for services to the allied health professions.

References

Living people
1961 births
British women academics
Speech and language pathologists
Members of the Order of the British Empire
Alumni of the University of Manchester